Ideal Jawa (India) Ltd was an Indian motorcycle company based in Mysore which sold licensed Jawa motorcycles beginning in 1960 under the brand name Jawa and from 1973 as Yezdi. The name Yezdi was established by a phonetic transcription of Czech language verb "jezdí" (rides). The catchphrase for the bikes sold by the firm was "'Forever Bike, Forever Value". Relaunched in 2022, the new catchphrase is "'Not for the saint hearted". Jawa motorcycles were introduced in India in 1960 and they have a cult following to this present day. Production was carried out directly in India by Ideal Jawa India Ltd based out of Mysore . The Yezdi factory was located along the railway line which heads to  Mysore Junction. The factory was inaugurated by the then Governor of Mysore State, Sri Jayachamaraja Wadiyar, Maharaja of Mysore in 1961.

The Jawa 250 Type 353/04 designated as 'A' Type, Yezdi 250 'B' Type, Yezdi 250 Roadking, Yezdi 350 Twin (type 634) and Yezdi 250 Monarch models are driven to this day in various parts of the country. Jawa and Yezdi bikes, especially the ones with fuel tank paddings and ignition systems on the fuel tank are now collectors items. The company stopped production in 1996.

There are still several bike enthusiasts in the country. There are several bike clubs across the country, some of them even organizing long distance rallies.

In January 2022, Yezdi was relaunched by Mahindra & Mahindra through their Classic Legends subsidiary. Three model were introduced, the Roadster, Scrambler and Adventure. Yezdi motorcycles will be sold alongside Jawa motorcycles in India.

Models
There have been many models of this brand before the company shut its doors in 1996. 
Their various models included:
Jawa 250 typ 353/04 Kyvacka called 'A' Type (under license)
Jawa 50 Pionyr typ 555 (under license)
Jawa 50 Jet 'A' Series 
Yezdi 60 Jet 'B' Series
Jawa / Yezdi 250 'B' Type (Radial Head & Dimple Tank Transition Model)
Yezdi 250 'B' Type (Model B)
Yezdi 250 Oilking (CB Points and Oil Pump) 'C' Type
Yezdi 250 Roadking (CB Points) 'C' Type
Yezdi B250 Deluxe 'B' Type or "B1"
Yezdi D250 Classic 'D' Type
Yezdi 250 CL II 'D' Type
Yezdi 250 Deluxe 'D' Type
Yezdi 60 Jet 'C' Series
Yezdi 60 Colt
Yezdi 175 (CB Points)
Yezdi 60 Colt Deluxe
Jawa / Yezdi 350 Twin (Jawa 350 typ 634 Powered)
Yezdi 175 Deluxe (CDI)
Yezdi 250 Roadking (CDI) 'C' Type
Yezdi 250 Monarch (CDI) 'C' Type
I.Jawa 250 Roadking (CDI) 'C' Type (Export Model)
Yezdi 250 MT (CDI) 'C' Type (Export Model)
Yezdi 125 Deluxe (Never released)
Yezdi 250 Supersprint 'C' Type (Never released)
Relaunched in 2022
Yezdi Roadster
Yezdi Scrambler
Yezdi Adventure

The 'A', 'B', 'C', 'D' Types are the model of Engine that particular bike has.

Ideal Jawa also exported many of the above models to over 61 countries around the world including Turkey, Nigeria, Sri Lanka, Egypt and others. Guatemala was supplied with custom White Yezdi Roadkings for their Police forces. Some Yezdi 175s were supplied to an oil company in Ghana. A model exported to Venezuela was called the Yezdi 250 MT. A few Yezdi Monarchs were used for Pizza delivery in Abu Dhabi, UAE.

End of production
When the company was forced to shut down, it was producing the 175, Monarch, Deluxe, Road Kings and CL II. The main reason for the company's collapse was labor trouble and increasing levels of pollution control norms which were making the two stroke bikes that the company produced obsolete. With the advent of Yamaha and Honda in India, these bikes lost their status as Yezdis were heavier and in some cases slower with lower fuel efficiency.

In motorsports
Ideal Jawa had factory teams for both road races at Sholavaram and the National Motorcycle Rally Championships. Yezdis were preferred rally bikes in the 80s and 90s.

Aftermath
Though the Yezdi factory is closed and Yezdi bikes are vintage to the present day many people in India are having a craze for these bikes and own them. Yezdi bike clubs have been created where members show off their Yezdi bikes and by doing so, are trying to revive the craze for these bikes.

Relaunch
Starting 13 January 2022 the Yezdi brand has been reintroduced in the Indian market by Classic Legends, after a gap of 25 years. There are three models which have been launched - Scrambler, Roadster and Adventure.

Photo gallery

See also
 Jawa Motors

References

External links

www.yezdi.com

Motorcycle manufacturers of India
Defunct motor vehicle manufacturers of India
Motorcycles of India
Companies based in Mysore
1960 establishments in Mysore State
Indian companies established in 1996
Indian companies disestablished in 1996
Vehicle manufacturing companies established in 1960
Vehicle manufacturing companies disestablished in 1960